In 1973, several notable coup d'états took place:

1973 Afghan coup d'état
1973 Chilean coup d'état
1973 Rwandan coup d'état
1973 Uruguayan coup d'état